Alex Sangha  is a Canadian social worker and documentary film producer.  He is the founder of Sher Vancouver which is a registered charity for lesbian, gay, bisexual, transgender, and queer (LGBTQ) South Asians and their friends.  Sangha was the first Sikh to become a Grand Marshal of the Vancouver Pride Parade.  Sangha received the Meritorious Service Medal from Governor General Julie Payette in 2018 for his work founding Sher Vancouver.  Sangha's first short documentary film, My Name Was January, won 14 awards and garnered 66 official selections at film festivals around the world. Sangha's debut feature documentary, Emergence: Out of the Shadows, was an official selection at Out on Film in Atlanta, Image+Nation in Montreal, and Reelworld in Toronto.  The film was the closing night film at both the South Asian Film Festival of Montreal and the Vancouver International South Asian Film Festival where it picked up Best Documentary. Emergence: Out of the Shadows also had a double festival premiere at the KASHISH Mumbai International Queer Film Festival and the Mumbai International Film Festival during the same week, where it was in competition at both film festivals for Best Documentary.  The film also had an in-person and online screening at the 46th annual Frameline: San Francisco International LGBTQ+ Film Festival  which is "the longest-running, largest and most widely recognized LGBTQ+ film exhibition event in the world."

Early life 
Sangha was born in Gravesend, Kent, England.  His birth name is Amar Singh Sangha.  He was raised in metro Vancouver, British Columbia, Canada, specifically Surrey and North Delta.  His father, Dalbir Singh Sangha, and his mother, Jaspal Kaur Sangha, are both of the Sikh faith from Punjab, India.  Sangha was largely raised by his mother.  His mother received a standing ovation for delivering a speech about embracing her gay son in 2018.  Sangha has an older and younger brother, and a half-brother through his Dad's second marriage.

Education and career 
Sangha completed an MSc in Public Administration and Public Policy from the Department of Government from the London School of Economics.  He has a Master of Social Work from Dalhousie University in Halifax, Nova Scotia, as well as a Bachelor of Social Work from the University of British Columbia with a First Class Standing.  In addition, Sangha completed an Associate of Arts Degree at Douglas College in New Westminster, British Columbia, and graduated Grade 12 from Frank Hurt Secondary in Surrey.

Sangha is a Registered Clinical Social Worker and a Registered Clinical Counsellor with a private counselling practice in North Delta.  He previously worked as an instructor, clinician, social worker, team leader, and youth counsellor.

Personal life 
Sangha identifies as a gay South Asian male and described his coming out experience as very alienating and isolating as a teenager, and he had a hard time with internalized homophobia.   In November 2016, Sangha provided support and assistance for a Sikh international student from Punjab, India who was disowned by his family for being gay and who contacted Sher Vancouver for help.  Sangha later referred to this student as part of the family.  In May 2020, Sangha wrote a commentary which was published in The Times of India which described a "spiritual experience" he had when he was 19.  The commentary further described the impact this experience had on his social work career and community service as a gay activist, as well as helping him come to terms with his sexuality as a gay Punjabi Sikh male. On October 10, 2020, on World Mental Health Day, the London School of Economics Alumni published on their internal communication channels and social media platforms a commentary Alex wrote about being "blessed with bipolar," because it makes him live as a creative humanitarian. He is also the recipient of the Courage to Come Back Award from Coast Mental Health for 2021.  In January 2022, Sangha wrote a commentary that was published in India that explained his "spiritual philosophy" on being gay, having children, and God.

Sher Vancouver 
Sangha founded Sher Vancouver in April 2008.  He launched the Dosti project which was an anti-bullying, anti-racism, homophobia, and transphobia workshop that went into high schools.  The project was unique because it included coming out stories from a South Asian perspective.  Sangha launched the Out and Proud project which profiled amazing queer South Asians from around the world including from Canada, United States, United Kingdom, and India.  Sangha developed a free crisis counselling program and peer support groups for Sher Vancouver members.  In 2015, Sangha launched the January Marie Lapuz Youth Leadership Award to recognize youth from all over the world doing great work in the LGBTQ community.  In 2016, Sangha became the first Sikh to become the Grand Marshal of the Vancouver Pride Parade.  In 2017, Sangha led the Sher Vancouver contingent in the Vancouver Vaisakhi Parade and in doing so made history as the first LGBTQ South Asian organization to ever march in the parade.  In 2018, Sangha celebrated the tenth anniversary of Sher Vancouver with the Desi-Q Cultural Celebration in Surrey.  In 2019, Sangha successfully lobbied the City of Delta in British Columbia, on behalf of Sher Vancouver, to install rainbow park benches in the city to support diversity and inclusion.  In July 2020, Sangha, on behalf of Sher Vancouver, released Queersome Desi Resources which is a specially curated comprehensive list of Queer South Asian Resources from around the world.  As part of Pride celebrations in British Columbia in 2020, the CBC profiled Sangha as part of a Proud to Shine campaign to recognize his work as a social worker, filmmaker, and founder of Sher Vancouver. In September 2021, Sangha delivered the Paul Cheng Memorial Lecture to incoming social work students at the University of British Columbia. He was selected as the 2020 winner of the Inspiring Social Worker of the Year Award in part for his work in Sher Vancouver.  The Sher Vancouver LGBTQ Friends Society became a registered charity on July 6, 2021.

Dignity Seniors Society 
Sangha is one of the founders of the Dignity Seniors Society which is a non-profit society that aims to support vulnerable LGBTQ seniors in Vancouver.  The Dignity Seniors Society was originally the Dignity House Advisory Committee (DHAC) which was a Master of Social Work practicum project of Sangha.  The intent of the DHAC was to build affordable housing for LGBTQ seniors.  Sangha managed to secure sufficient funds from the Vancity Community Foundation and the United Way of the Lower Mainland to complete a market survey of the need and demand for affordable housing within the community.

Books and writing 
Sangha has been a contributor for The Times of India, Huffington Post Canada, Vancouver Observer, and Georgia Straight.  His writings focus on social justice themes such as alleviating poverty, improving access to the legal system and democracy, LGBTQ rights, social affairs, issues that impact the South Asian community, and Canadian, British Columbian, and local politics from Surrey.

Sangha has published three books through AuthorHouse.  Imagine: Ideas that Challenge the Status Quo (2010),  The Modern Thinker:  Timeless Ideas, Inspiration, and Hope for the 21st Century (2011), and Catalyst:  A Collection of Commentaries to Get Us Talking (2013).  Catalyst was a Finalist in the Current Events and Social Change category of the Next Generation Indie Book Awards of 2014.

Films 

Sangha produced a short documentary film directed by Elina Gress and Lenee Son, My Name Was January.  It was about Sher Vancouver's late social coordinator, January Marie Lapuz, who was tragically murdered in New Westminster in September 2012.  The film focuses on January's strengths and struggles and provides a platform for other trans women of colour to have a voice.   My Name Was January was an official selection at the National Screen Institute Online Short Film Festival in Winnipeg, Manitoba.  It was also a Finalist at the San Francisco Bay Area Sex Worker Film and Arts Festival.  My Name Was January won 13 awards, and garnered 56 official selections at film festivals around the world.  In 2018, the New West Record selected Sangha as one of the Top 10 people who had an impact in the arts in New Westminster.

Sangha's debut feature documentary film, this time directed by Vinay Giridhar entitled, Emergence: Out of the Shadows, is about gay and lesbian South Asian people and their coming out journey and the reactions of the parents. He received training and mentorship from the National Screen Institute in Winnipeg, Manitoba to help him with Emergence: Out of the Shadows. The film had its World Premiere at Cinema Diverse: The Palm Springs LGBTQ Film Festival where it picked up a Festival Favourite award, and started its festival run in other US festivals such as Out On Film in Atlanta which is an Academy Award qualifying festival and the Chicago South Asian Film Festival where it picked up a Special Mention for Director Vinay Giridhar for Best Feature Documentary. Emergence: Out of the Shadows was also an official selection at Image+Nation in Montreal, Reelworld Film Festival in Toronto, and was the closing night film at both the South Asian Film Festival of Montreal and the Vancouver International South Asian Film Festival where it picked up Best Documentary. The film was also nominated for three awards at the Vancouver Asian Film Festival including Best Canadian Feature Award, Best Director for Canadian Feature Award, and Best Cinematography for Canadian Feature Award for 2021.  Emergence: Out of the Shadows entered the Canadian Screen Awards for Best Feature Documentary and Best Editing for 2022. Emergence: Out of the Shadows had its South Asian Premiere at Reel Desires:  Chennai International Queer Film Festival. Emergence: Out of the Shadows also had a double festival premiere at the KASHISH Mumbai International Queer Film Festival and the Mumbai International Film Festival during the same week, where it was in competition at both film festivals for Best Documentary.  The film also had an in-person and online screening at the 46th annual Frameline: San Francisco International LGBTQ+ Film Festival  which is "the longest-running, largest and most widely recognized LGBTQ+ film exhibition event in the world."

Expo 2022 
In 2019, Sangha and Upkar Tatlay delivered a presentation to Surrey City Council to bring a World Exposition to Surrey to celebrate the diverse cultures and heritage of the city.  The Expo would have a focus on South Asian culture since Surrey has one of the largest South Asian diaspora communities outside of South Asia.  Over twenty letters of support from stakeholders was provided to endorse the Expo including from Simon Fraser University and Vancity.  Mayor Doug McCallum stated that the Expo “shows a lot of promise”  and City Council directed staff to prepare an initial report on the proposal.

Honours and awards 
Meritorious Service Medal from the Governor General of Canada
BC Community Achievement Award
Queen Elizabeth II Diamond Jubilee Medal
2011 Top 25 Canadian Immigrants Award

References

External links 
 Official Website of Alex Sangha

Canadian social workers
Canadian documentary film producers
Living people
1972 births
21st-century Canadian LGBT people
Recipients of the Meritorious Service Decoration
Canadian Sikhs